Papua New Guinea–Philippines relations refers to the bilateral relations of Papua New Guinea and the Philippines. Papua New Guinea has an embassy in Manila and the Philippines has an embassy in Port Moresby, which is also accredited to the Solomon Islands, Vanuatu and Fiji.

History

The Philippines established a Consulate-General in Port Moresby on August 19, 1974. Upon Papua New Guinea's independence on September 16, 1975 the Philippine consulate in Port Moresby was upgraded to an embassy making the Philippines one of the first countries to formalize diplomatic relations with Papua New Guinea.

Economic relations
In March 2009, The Philippines and Papua New Guinea entered into a Memorandum of Understanding (MoU) that would enhance the cooperation between the two countries on the development of fisheries. The MoU will facilitate technology transfer in aquaculture development, promotion of shipping ventures, investments, technical training, joint research, and “strategic complementation” of each country's plans in the Coral Triangle – or the waters between the Philippines, Indonesia, and the Pacific Islands. The fisheries trade is significantly responsible for recent overall trade growth between the Philippines and Papua New Guinea.

In March 2012 the Philippine Bureau of Fisheries and Aquatic Resources (BFAR) has started discussions with Papua New Guinea officials on the issues of access and trade. Under the proposed agreement, Papua New Guinea is willing to give fishing rights to Filipino commercial fishermen in its waters in exchange for agricultural commodities and rice.

There are about 25,000 Filipinos currently in Papua New Guinea as of 2013.

Political relations
Papua New Guinea asked the Philippines for its support for its full membership bid in the Association of Southeast Asian Nations in 2009.

References

Philippines
Bilateral relations of the Philippines